Njegovuđa is a village in the municipality of Žabljak, Montenegro.

Demographics
According to the 2003 census, the town had a population of 227 people.

According to the 2011 census, its population was 216.

Ethnicity in 2011

References

Serb communities in Montenegro
Populated places in Žabljak Municipality